Dascha Yolaine Polanco (born December 3, 1982) is a Dominican-American actress. She is known for portraying the role of Dayanara "Daya" Diaz on the Netflix series Orange Is the New Black, and for the role of Cuca in the 2021 movie In the Heights.

Early life
Polanco was born in Santo Domingo, Dominican Republic, and moved to the United States at a young age. She was raised in Sunset Park, Brooklyn, and Miami by her father, a mechanic, and mother, a cosmetologist. Polanco is the oldest of three children; she has a brother and sister.

Career
Polanco aspired to be an actress from an early age but "always doubted auditioning because of [her] weight", so she completed a bachelor's degree in psychology at Hunter College. After college she began working in the healthcare industry with the intention of becoming a nurse. She was working in hospital administration at Montefiore Medical Center in the Bronx while studying nursing when she gained the courage to pursue acting again and registered herself with an acting studio. She attended BIH Studios in New York, and while there was signed by the talent agency Shirley Grant Management. Her first acting credits were minor parts in the television series Unforgettable and NYC 22.

In 2012, Polanco was cast in the Netflix series Orange Is the New Black as Dayanara "Daya" Diaz.

In 2013, Polanco appeared in the independent film Gimme Shelter before returning to her role on Orange Is the New Black for the show's second season. In June 2014, it was announced that she had been promoted from a recurring role to a series regular for the show's third season, which was released in June 2015. She appeared in the comedy films The Cobbler and Joy, and starred in the film The Perfect Match.

In 2018, Polanco had a recurring role in The Assassination of Gianni Versace: American Crime Story, and in 2019, she had a recurring role in Netflix series, Russian Doll and When They See Us.

In 2021, Polanco played the role of Cuca, one of the lead salon ladies, in the film In the Heights.

From 2021 to 2022, Polaco voiced Ms. Camilla Torres, the mother of Winston who owns a record shop, in the animated series Karma's World.

Personal life
Polanco has two children, a daughter and a son. Her daughter portrayed a younger version of Polanco's character in the fifth season of Orange is the New Black. In 2015, Polanco was accused of assaulting a teenager, allegedly having “punched several times and scratched”. The charges were later conditionally dismissed.

Filmography

Film

Television

References

External links

1982 births
Living people
Actresses from Miami
Actresses from New York City
American film actresses
American television actresses
American voice actresses
American people of Dominican Republic descent
Dominican Republic emigrants to the United States
Dominican Republic film actresses
Dominican Republic television actresses
Entertainers from the Bronx
Hispanic and Latino American actresses
Hunter College alumni
Mixed-race Dominicans
People from Santo Domingo
People from Sunset Park, Brooklyn
21st-century American actresses